Sabina Wanjiru Chege (born 22 August 1978) is a Kenyan politician and former television actress and radio presenter who also served as the Woman Representative in the National Assembly for Murang'a County (2013–2022).

Education and early career
Sabina Wanjiru Chege attended the Kenya Institute of Management and the University of Nairobi where she obtained a Bachelor of Education degree and a master's degree in communication. Prior to entering politics she was an actress in the television soap Tausi where the played the role of Rehema. She subsequently worked as a radio presenter on Coro FM and in radio management at Kameme FM and Kenya Broadcasting Corporation. She is married with three children.

Political career
She was elected to the National Assembly as women's representative for Muranga county in 2013 with 96.6% of the vote. She was a member of the National Alliance party. In the 2017 general election she was re-elected, now as a member of the Jubilee Party. The Jubilee party was formed in 2016 as a successor to the Jubilee Alliance, a coalition of several political parties including Chege's National Alliance party. In her first term in parliament she was chairperson of Departmental Committee on Education, Research & Technology and a member of the Constitutional Implementation Oversight Committee. Since 2017 she has served as chairperson of the Parliamentary Committee on Health.

In 2019 she sponsored the Kenya National Blood Transfusion Service Bill which commercialise blood transfusions and create a new national body to coordinate blood donations nationally. This move was criticised by the Kenya National Union of Medical Laboratory Officers. She also sponsored the Breastfeeding Mothers Bill that would require employers to provide facilities and breaks for employees who were breastfeeding.

She had declared an interest in becoming the running-mate for Kenyan Deputy President William Ruto in the 2022 presidential election. Now supporting Raila Odinga.

Election results

See also
 Murang'a County
 Parliament of Kenya

References

External links
Website of the Parliament of Kenya

Living people
Kikuyu people
University of Nairobi alumni
The National Alliance politicians
Members of the National Assembly (Kenya)
21st-century Kenyan women politicians
21st-century Kenyan politicians
1978 births